Ian Frederick Gildart (born 14 October 1969) is an English former professional rugby league footballer who in the 1980s and 1990s played for Wigan, Wakefield Trinity and Oldham as a , before assisting at Wigan St Patricks ARLFC.

Background
Gildart was born in Ince-in-Makerfield, Lancashire, England. Ian is the father of the rugby league footballer:; Oliver Gildart.

Playing career

World Club Challenge
Ian Gildart was a non-playing interchange/substitute in Wigan's 8-2 victory over Manly-Warringah Sea Eagles in the 1987 World Club Challenge at Central Park, Wigan on Wednesday 7 October 1987, and an  interchange/substitute in the 21-4 victory over Penrith Panthers in the 1991 World Club Challenge at Anfield, Liverpool on Wednesday 2 October 1991.

Championship appearances
During Ian Gildart's time, there were Wigan's victories in the Championship during the 1989–90 season, 1990–91 season, 1991–92 season, 1992–93 season and 1993–94 season.

Challenge Cup
Ian Gildart was an  interchange/substitute in Wigan's 36-14 victory over Warrington in the 1990 Challenge Cup Final during the 1989–90 season at Wembley Stadium, London on Saturday 28 April 1990.

Regal Trophy
Ian Gildart played right- in Wigan's 24-12 victory over Halifax in the 1989–90 Regal Trophy Final during the 1989–90 season at Headingley, Leeds on Saturday 13 January 1990.

References

External links
Statistics at wigan.rlfans.com

1969 births
Living people
English rugby league players
Wigan Warriors players
Wakefield Trinity players
Oldham R.L.F.C. players
Widnes Vikings players
Chorley Lynx players
People from Ince-in-Makerfield
Rugby league players from Wigan
Rugby league second-rows